CC, cc, or C-C may refer to:

Arts, entertainment, and media

Fictional characters
 C.C. (Code Geass), a character in the Code Geass anime series, pronounced "C-two"
 C.C. Babcock, a character in the American sitcom The Nanny
 Comedy Chimp, a character in Sonic Boom, called "CC" by Doctor Eggman

Gaming
 Command & Conquer (C&C), a series of real-time strategy games and the first game in the series
 Crowd control (video gaming), the ability to limit the number of mobs actively fighting during an encounter

Other arts, music, entertainment, and media
 Cannibal Corpse, an American death metal band.
 CC Media Holdings, the former name of iHeartMedia
 Closed captioning, a process of displaying text on a visual display, such as a TV screen
 Comedy Central, an American television network (URL is cc.com)

Brands and enterprises

Food and drink
 Canadian Club, a brand of whisky
 CC's, a tortilla chip brand in Australia

Other companies
 Stylized interlocking CC, the monogram of Coco Chanel, and brand logo for the House of Chanel
 Chemours (former NYSE stock symbol CC)
 Circuit City (former NYSE stock symbol CC), a former American electronics retailer
 College Confidential (company), a college admissions counseling company

Mathematics, science, and technology

Computing
 CC (complexity), a complexity class in computational complexity theory
 Adobe Creative Cloud, a series of subscription-based software developed and sold by Adobe Inc.
 C compiler, the original/legacy C language compilation system
 C++, a programming language
 Common Criteria, an international standard (ISO 15408) for computer security
 Cyclomatic complexity, a source-code metric
 International Conference on Compiler Construction, an academic conference
 Cryptocurrency

Other uses in mathematics, science, and technology
 Capacity credit, a fraction of the installed capacity of a power plant which can be relied upon during the system stress
 Carbonaceous chondrite, a type of meteorite
 CC (cat), the first genetically cloned pet
 C-C, a locomotive classification; see AAR wheel arrangement
 Chief complaint, a medical patient's primary reported symptom
 Classification of Types of Construction, for buildings
 Clausius–Clapeyron relation, an equation used in climatology
 Climate control, various technologies to control the temperature and humidity
 Combustion chamber, or for instance in a turbojet engine the combustor
 Complex conductivity (measurement method), a measurement method in geophysics
 Complex conjugate, an operation on complex numbers, commonly abbreviated as c. c.
 Coupled cluster, a numerical technique in computational chemistry
 Cubic centimetre (cc), a unit of volume
 Engine displacement, where cc is used as shorthand for the cylinder volume in cubic centimetres

Organizations
 Canarian Coalition, a Spanish political party based in the Canary Islands
 Caribbean Community, an international organization with fifteen members
 CC, mint mark of Carson City Mint, a former branch of the United States mint
 Coburger Convent, a German and Austrian student organization
 Creative Commons, a non-profit organization in the field of copyright licensing
 Creative Commons license, a copyright license

Places
 Carson City, Nevada, United States, commonly abbreviated as CC
 Cocos (Keeling) Islands (ISO 3166 code), an Australian territory
 .cc, the Internet country code top-level domain for Cocos (Keeling) Islands, an Australian territory

Schools
 Colorado College, a liberal arts college in Colorado Springs, Colorado, US
 Detroit Catholic Central High School, a private all-male high school in Novi, Michigan, US

Sports
 CC Sabathia, a retired American baseball pitcher
 Champion Carnival, a professional wrestling tournament
 Conference Carolinas, an NCAA Division II athletic conference

Transportation

Automobiles
 Changan Raeton CC, a Chinese mid-size sedan
 Senova CC, a Chinese mid-size sports sedan
 Volkswagen CC, a German mid-size sedan
 Volkswagen Arteon, sold in China as Volkswagen CC

Transportation companies
 Air Atlanta Icelandic (IATA airline designator), an Icelandic airline
 Chicago Central and Pacific Railroad (reporting mark CC)
 MacAir Airlines (former IATA airline designator), a defunct Australian airline

Other in transportation
 C-C, a wheel configuration for diesel and electric locomotives

Other uses
 Prefix "cc", to specify column numbers as in-source-locator in old citations
 CC cream, a cosmetic marketing term
 CC, post-nominal letters for Companion of the Order of Canada, a Canadian honour
 200 (number) in Roman numerals
 Carbon copy, or courtesy copy, in the context of letter or email-writing
 Colon classification, a library classification scheme
 Component city, a legal class of cities in the Philippines
 Consular corps, the staff of a consulate
 Credit card

See also
 CCC (disambiguation)
 CeCe (disambiguation)
 Corpus Christi (disambiguation)
 Seesee, a species of bird in the pheasant family
 Sissi (disambiguation)